This is a list of Japanese entrepreneurs.

 Asano Sōichirō
 Busujima Kunio
 Enomoto Daisuke
 Fujita Den
 Fukuda Yoshitaka
 Honda Soichirō
 Horie Takafumi
 Ibuka Masaru
 Itō Joi
 Itō Masatoshi
 Iwasaki Fukuzo
 Iwasaki Yataro
 Jinnai Ryōichi
 Kawakami Gen'ichi
 Kazutoshi Sakurai
 Matsushita Konosuke
 Mikimoto Kōkichi
 Mitsui Takatoshi
 Mori Minoru
 Mori Taikichirō
 Morita Akio
 Nomura Tokushichi II
 Ojima Susumu
 Saji Nobutaka
 Sasakawa Ryōichi
 Son Masayoshi
 Tohmatsu Nobuzo
 Toyoda Eiji
 Tsutsumi Yoshiaki
 Yamauchi Hiroshi
 Fusajiro Yamauchi
 Yanai Tadashi
 Yasuda Zenjirō

Entrepreneurs
List
Japanese